Rydon is a British construction company which was founded in 1978 and employs over 650 people. Its head office is in Forest Row, East Sussex, and it has offices in Bristol, Dartford, London and Preston.

Controversies

Grenfell Tower
Rydon was the main contractor for refurbishment of the Grenfell Tower (destroyed by fire in June 2017), in the Royal Borough of Kensington and Chelsea, although it sub-contracted the "design and installation of the external cladding" to Harley Facades. The contractor originally scheduled to undertake the Grenfell renovation was rejected because its quotation of £11.28 million exceeded the £10 million budget set by the Royal Borough of Kensington and Chelsea and Kensington and Chelsea TMO (KCTMO). Rydon gained approval for the project with a quote of £8.7 million after the contract was put out to further competitive tender. The geographer Gordon MacLeod has described KCTMO's contract with Rydon, and Rydon's use of subcontractors in the refurbishment, as an instance of "the disavowal of democracy" that led to the fire.

The UK government subsequently placed Rydon on an official list of firms recommended to build high-rise housing, a move that sparked anger among Grenfell survivors.

In reaction to comments made on Twitter by pressure group Grenfell United, Robert Jenrick, the Secretary of State for Housing, Communities and Local Government, replied on Twitter stating that "The contractor should not bid for further work until we know the truth."

Separately to Jenrick's comments, the Mayor of London, Sadiq Khan, announced that Rydon would be excluded from the London Development Panel (LDP2) framework listing approved suppliers for housing works until the Grenfell Tower Inquiry outcome is known.

In response to a request filed on behalf of several invidividuals and companies linked to the Grenfell Tower refurbishment (including Rydon), the Attorney General for England and Wales, Suella Braverman, confirmed that witnesses would be immune from prosecution based on their statements to the enquiry.

In July 2020 the Grenfell Tower Inquiry heard that Rydon secretly kept £126,000 paid by KCTMO when switching the cladding on Grenfell Tower, by informing KCTMO that the savings afforded by using more flammable plastic-filled aluminium panels in place of the originally specified zinc cladding would be less than they in fact were. The inquiry also heard that Rydon promised on five occasions to appoint fire safety advisers but failed to do so. During the inquiry Simon Lawrence, who led Rydon's work on Grenfell Tower, described residents of the buildings who complained about fire safety conditions prior to the fire as "aggressive"; he claimed that "regardless of what work was being carried out [they] would still have found a reason to complain."

Chalcots Estate
Rydon was the main contractor responsible for the 2015–2016 refurbishment of the Chalcots Estate, in the London Borough of Camden. In November 2019, Camden Council began High Court proceedings against Rydon to recover costs relating to repairs to the Chalcots Estate.

Divestment
In April 2021, Rydon Group sold its southeastern and southwestern contracting businesses, with 100 staff and 10 Rydon Construction contracts ranging in value from £10m to £180m, to a newly established company, Real.

References

External links
 

British companies established in 1978
Construction and civil engineering companies of the United Kingdom
1978 establishments in England
Construction and civil engineering companies established in 1978